Presidency English School (Aims Educational Academy) is a school which started in Badlapur, India, in June 2007.
The school is located at Katrap DP Road Near Spandan Hospital (Badlapur E).

History 
The school is run by Aims Educational Academy which was founded by Late. Shri Vidyadhar S. Upadhyay. Aims Educational Academy also runs another school by the same name in Badlapur Village for the village children.

Trust and management 
The trust is chaired by Smt. Anita V. Upadhyay.

School 
The school is operational till X Grade. The Head Master of the School is Shri. A.P Dubey who has more than 40 years of teaching experience. In this academic year the school has more than 450 students on its rolls. The last two X grade results has been 100%.

Activities 
Presidency English School conducts a variety of functions including Annual Day, National Days and various cultural days.

References

Schools in Thane district
Educational institutions established in 2007
2007 establishments in Maharashtra